Bryan Dean Cutler (born April 2, 1975) is an American politician and former Speaker of the Pennsylvania House of Representatives. A Republican, Cutler represents the  100th legislative district of the Pennsylvania House of Representatives. He was first elected in 2006, defeating incumbent Gibson C. Armstrong. He was elected House Majority Leader after the 2018 elections, and he became Speaker on June 22, 2020, after the resignation of Mike Turzai.

Early life and career
Cutler was born in Peach Bottom, Pennsylvania and attended Solanco High School. He graduated from Lancaster School of Radiology in 1995 and earned a bachelor's degree from Lebanon Valley College in 2001. He worked as an X-ray technologist at Lancaster Regional Medical Center and as a Manager of Support Services at Lancaster General Hospital. In 2006, he earned a J.D. degree with a certificate in health care from Widener University School of Law.

He served on the Drumore Township Planning Commission and represented Drumore Township in the Regional Planning Commission.

Pennsylvania House of Representatives

He was first elected in 2006, defeating incumbent Gibson C. Armstrong, who voted against the controversial 2005 legislative pay raise. Despite his initial vote against the pay raise Armstrong later filed paperwork to receive it angering many of his constituents.

In 2014, in response to paychecks being subject to the state taking union dues from them, Cutler put forth a proposal to have this discontinued. Cutler argued that the state ought to stay out of the handling of union dues because the state is aware that a certain percentage of union dues is used for political purposes including lobbying and paying for ads.

In 2015, Cutler voiced some of the worries he had about Governor Tom Wolf's proposed severance tax. Cutler said, “If we’re gonna stunt the economic growth and future impact I think we have to consider that.”

Later in 2015, following the terror attacks in Paris, Cutler supported keeping Syrian refugees out of Pennsylvania. Governor Tom Wolf's permitting of Syrian refugees into the state was criticized by Cutler and other Pennsylvania Republicans. Cutler has said, “there is a real difference between those that seek peace and security and those that would use this opportunity to advance terrorism.”

In 2016, Cutler co-sponsored a memorandum in support of House Bill 1948, which was put forth by State Representative Kathy Rapp. The bill's purpose was to make it so that abortions in Pennsylvania would only be permitted during the first 20 weeks of pregnancy. Cutler, along with Rapp and Representative Bryan Barbin, wrote in the memorandum that the bill would also put a stop to dismemberment being used as an abortion method.

Cutler supports the Atlantic Sunrise natural gas pipeline passing through Lancaster County. Due to concerns involving private property and nature reserves, a request was made to have the pipeline re-routed. However, believing that it would be less of a problem for roads, streams and properties, residents of Conestoga Township and Martic Township petitioned in favor of the first proposed route. Cutler was given these petitions.

Cutler was against legalizing medical cannabis in Pennsylvania and opposed a bill that would do so. He cited the illegal federal status under the Controlled Substances Act, the opioid epidemic, and other concerns.

References

External links
Pennsylvania House of Representatives - Bryan Cutler official PA House website
Pennsylvania House Republican Caucus - Representative Bryan Cutler official Party website
Elect Byran Cutler 100th District House of Representatives official campaign site
Bryan Cutler 100th District Candidate Pennsylvania House of Representatives archived 2006 campaign site

|-

|-

|-

1975 births
21st-century American politicians
Lebanon Valley College alumni
Living people
People from Lancaster County, Pennsylvania
Republican Party members of the Pennsylvania House of Representatives
Speakers of the Pennsylvania House of Representatives
Widener University alumni